Rolf Lauper (17 January 1960 – 18 August 2006) was a Swiss footballer who played in the late 1970s, the 1980s and early 1990s as defender.

Lauper played his youth football with Young Fellows Zürich and advanced to their first team during their promotion season 1976–77 from the Nationalliga B, the second tier of Swiss football. Lauper stayed with the club in the 1977–78 Nationalliga A. But this was not a successful season and the club suffered relegation.

Before the 1978–79 Nationalliga A season, Lauper signed a contract with Grasshopper Club. He stayed with the club for two and a half years, before he moved on to FC Wettingen who at that time played in the Nationalliga B. With Wettingen in the 1981–82 Nationalliga B season Lauper won promotion. He stayed with the club for one more season.

Lauper joined FC Basel's first team for their 1983–84 season under team manager Ernst August Künnecke. After playing in ten test games, Lauper played his domestic league debut for the club in the away game on 10 August 1983 as Basel were defeated 2–4 by AC Bellinzona.

In his two seasons with the club, Lauper played a total of 106 games for Basel scoring five goals. 49 of these games were in the Nationalliga A, four in the Swiss Cup and 53 were friendly games. He scored all five goals during the test games.

Following Basel, Lauper moved to FC Baden in the Nationalliga B for three seasons then to SC Zug for two seasons. Finally he ended his football career spending two seasons with FC Brüttisellen, who escaped relegation in the 1991–92 season, but suffered relegation the next.

References

Sources
 Die ersten 125 Jahre. Publisher: Josef Zindel im Friedrich Reinhardt Verlag, Basel. 
 Verein "Basler Fussballarchiv" Homepage

SC Young Fellows Juventus players
Grasshopper Club Zürich players
FC Wettingen players
FC Basel players
FC Baden players
Swiss men's footballers
Association football defenders
1960 births
2006 deaths